Black River Township may refer to the following townships in the United States:

 Black River Township, Pennington County, Minnesota
 Black River Township, Butler County, Missouri
 Black River Township, Harnett County, North Carolina
 Black River Township, Lorain County, Ohio

See also 
 Black River (disambiguation)